Sunrisers Hyderabad (often abbreviated as SRH) are a franchise cricket team based in Hyderabad, India, which plays in the Indian Premier League (IPL). They were one of the eight teams to compete in the 2020 Indian Premier League, which was their eighth outing in IPL tournaments. The team was captained by David Warner and coached by Trevor Bayliss with Brad Haddin as assistant coach, Muttiah Muralitharan as bowling coach and VVS Laxman as mentor.

They began their season by losing their opening fixture on 21 September, and went on to become the last team to qualify for the play-offs by defeating Mumbai Indians on 3 November. They beat the Royal Challengers Bangalore in the Eliminator but lost to the Delhi Capitals in the Qualifier 2 by 17 runs to finish the season in third place.

Background
David Warner was reinstated as the captain of the Sunrisers replacing Kane Williamson on 27 February 2020.

The Board of Control for Cricket in India (BCCI) released the fixture details on 18 February 2020. The league stage was scheduled to start on 29 March 2020, with the opening match between Mumbai Indians and Chennai Super Kings, the two finalist of the previous season. On 13 March 2020, the BCCI postponed the tournament until 15 April, in view of the ongoing coronavirus pandemic. On 14 April 2020, the Prime Minister Narendra Modi said that the lockdown in India would last until at least 3 May 2020, with the tournament postponed further. The following day, the BCCI suspended the tournament indefinitely due to the pandemic.

On 17 May 2020, the Indian government relaxed nation-wide restrictions on sports events, allowing events to take place behind closed doors. On 24 May, Indian sports minister Kiren Rijiju stated that the decision on whether or not to allow the tournament to be conducted in 2020 will be made by the Indian government based on "the situation of the pandemic". On 2 August 2020, it was announced that the tournament would be played between 19 September and 10 November 2020 in the United Arab Emirates. On 10 August 2020, the Indian government gave its permission for the tournament to take place in the UAE. The schedule for the league stage of this season were released on 6 September with the Sunrisers Hyderabad playing their first match against the Royal Challengers Bangalore on 21 September in a home game at Dubai.

Player acquisition

In October 2019, ICC banned Shakib Al Hasan for two years after breaching the ICC's Anti-Corruption Code and hence was subsequently released from the squad by the Sunrisers Hyderabad on 15 November 2019.

The Sunrisers Hyderabad retained 18 players and released five players as they announced their retention list on 15 November 2019 ahead of the auction.

Retained players Abhishek Sharma, Basil Thampi, Bhuvneshwar Kumar, Billy Stanlake, David Warner, Jonny Bairstow, Kane Williamson, Manish Pandey, Mohammad Nabi, Rashid Khan, Sandeep Sharma, Shahbaz Nadeem, Shreevats Goswami, Siddarth Kaul, Khaleel Ahmed, Thangarasu Natarajan, Vijay Shankar, Wriddhiman Saha

Released players Deepak Hooda, Martin Guptill, Ricky Bhui, Shakib Al Hasan, Yusuf Pathan

Added players Virat Singh, Priyam Garg, Mitchell Marsh, Bavanaka Sandeep, Fabian Allen, Abdul Samad, Sanjay Yadav

Replacement players Jason Holder, Prithvi Raj

Squad 
 Players with international caps are listed in bold.
 Signed Year denotes year from which player is continuously associated with Sunrisers Hyderabad

Administration and support staff

Kit manufacturers and sponsors

Season overview

League stage

Standings

Results by match

Fixtures

The schedule for the league stage of this season were released on 6 September with the Sunrisers Hyderabad playing their first match against the Royal Challengers Bangalore on 21 September in a home game at Dubai.

League stage

Playoff stage

Eliminator

Qualifier 2

Statistics

IPL Statistics Full Table on Cricinfo

Awards and achievements

Awards
Man of the Match

Achievements
 Most dot balls bowled in an innings in the 2020 IPL : Rashid Khan (17)
 Best bowling economy in the 2020 IPL : Rashid Khan (5.37)
 Best bowling economy in an innings in the 2020 IPL : Rashid Khan (1.75)

Reaction
The Sunrisers captain David Warner said he was proud on the team making it to playoffs despite missing key players to injuries and also heaped praise on left-arm quick T. Natarajan who bowled more yorkers than anyone in this tournament. He said, “Natarajan has been waiting in the wings. So to get a chance, to have an IPL the way he has is outstanding.”

Rashid Khan was featured in both Cricbuzz and Sky Sports team of the tournament.

The ongoing pandemic impacted the brand value of IPL which saw a drop of 22% to an estimated value of 4.4billion post 2020 season. The Sunrisers also saw the decrease in their brand value by 4% to 57.4million in 2020, according to Brand Finance.

Notes

Footnotes

References

External links
Sunrisers Hyderabad official website

2020 Indian Premier League
Sunrisers Hyderabad seasons